This is a list of the heritage sites in Clanwilliam, Western Cape as recognized by the South African Heritage Resources Agency.

|}

References 

Tourist attractions in the Western Cape
Western Cape
Western Cape-related lists